Olive San Louie Anderson ( Lexington, Ohio, 1852–1886) was an American author and member of the first class of women students who entered the University of Michigan when it became coeducational in 1871. The university had admitted Madelon Stockwell (1845–1924), its first female student, in January 1870. In fall 1871, the university admitted thirty-three more women, two in law, eighteen in medicine, and thirteen in the Department of Science, Literature, and the Arts. Anderson was one of the thirteen.

Biography

Born on September 30, 1852, in Lexington, Ohio, she was the daughter of Alice Cook and Dr. Hugh P. Anderson, who died when she was young. Alice Cook being a descendant of Francis Cooke from the Mayflower. The family spent some time on the Iowa frontier, returning eventually to Mansfield, Ohio where she graduated from high school in 1869. After a short time teaching in public schools, she prepared for entry to the University of Michigan, passing her entrance examinations in 1871.

Career

Anderson did well at Michigan, and was the only woman honored with an "appointment", as it was then called, to speak at commencement. She planned a career in medicine but instead became a teacher. After living for a while in San Francisco she took a post teaching Greek and Latin at a college in Santa Barbara. While there, she wrote short sketches for eastern newspapers about the "quaint" Spanish lifestyle of the area. It was at this time that she wrote her autobiographical novel An American Girl. When the college at which she was teaching closed, she taught in various private schools until, in May 1882, she became a partner in a private school in San Rafael. She later served as this school's principal.

Early death

In June 1886, Anderson spent a month with an "Artistic League" on San Francisco Bay, partly on a boat and partly on shore. She was collecting materials for a book about California and preparing for foreign travel and study. Planning a series of panel sketches for which she was writing the literary material, her party went up the Sacramento River on a yacht called the Ariel. On June 5, the excursion's last morning, Anderson left the yacht with five members of the party to take a swim in the river. Seized with cramps, she sank before anyone could save her.
 
Anderson's body was sent to Mansfield, Ohio, where it was buried by her father's side. A friend, Elizabeth C. Curtis, collected some of her last writings, which Anderson would probably never have published, and printed 500 copies entitled "Stories and Sketches" in remembrance of her. An American Girl was thus Anderson's first and only novel.

Writing

Anderson published a book titled, in full, An American Girl, and Her Four Years in a Boys’ College, it was published in 1878 under the pen name "SOLA", an anagram of her initials. The book was published by D. Appleton and Company, a prestigious New York City publisher. 
 
Anderson built her novel around the character of Wilhelmine Elliot, the rebellious daughter of a free-thinking surgeon who had died during the Civil War. "Will", like Jo March in Louisa May Alcott’s Little Women, envies her male classmates’ talk of going to college, and when Michigan's flagship institution of higher learning opens its doors to women, insists on attending.  Although in her first year at Michigan, Will suffers feelings of rejection and persecution, ultimately she enjoys a stunning academic career and graduates at the top of her class.  The university selects her as the only female student to speak at commencement. The novel includes a romance, which is thwarted, and discussions of a range of topics in late-nineteenth-century American culture, such as women's struggles for higher education, courtship customs, and contemporary views of liberal religion and the women's rights movement.

See also
History of the University of Michigan

References

1852 births
University of Michigan alumni
19th-century American novelists
American women novelists
1886 deaths
Writers from San Rafael, California
People from Lexington, Ohio
People from Mansfield, Ohio
Novelists from Ohio
19th-century American women writers
American school principals
Women school principals and headteachers